I Can Only Imagine is a 2018 American Christian biographical drama film directed by the Erwin Brothers and written by Alex Cramer, Jon Erwin, and Brent McCorkle, based on the story behind the group MercyMe's song of the same name, the best-selling Christian single of all time. The film stars J. Michael Finley as Bart Millard, the lead singer who wrote the song about his relationship with his father (Dennis Quaid). Madeline Carroll, Trace Adkins, Priscilla Shirer, and Cloris Leachman also star.

I Can Only Imagine was released in the United States on March 16, 2018. It was a box office success, grossing $86 million worldwide against a production budget of $7 million, earning more than twelve times its budget. It is the fifth highest-grossing music biopic and sixth highest-grossing Christian film of all-time in the United States. Some critics praised it as inspiring and noted it as an improvement compared to other faith-based films, while others called it flat and by-the-numbers. At the 2018 Dove Awards, the film won "Inspirational Film of the Year".

Plot
Ten-year-old Bart Millard lives with his mother and abusive father Arthur in Texas. One day, Bart's mother drops him off at a Christian camp, where Bart meets Shannon. Upon his return from camp, Bart finds that his mother has left and movers are removing her belongings. Bart angrily confronts Arthur, who denies that his abusiveness was the reason she left.

Years later, in high school, Bart and Shannon are dating. Bart plays football to please Arthur, but is injured, breaking both ankles and ending his career. The only elective with openings is music class, so he reluctantly signs up. Initially, Bart is assigned to be a sound technician, but after overhearing him singing, the director casts him in the lead role in the school production of Oklahoma!. Bart overcomes his reluctance and gives an impressive performance, but does not tell Arthur, who finds out the night of the show when he happens to see a flyer for the show in a diner. Arthur suddenly collapses in pain, and finds out he has cancer, which he hides from Bart. The following morning, Bart antagonizes Arthur, who smashes a plate over his head. At church, Shannon sees the blood and presses Bart to open up, but he responds by breaking up with her, and leaves town to seek his fortune in the city.

Bart joins a band in need of a singer, and convinces Christian music producer Scott Brickell to manage the band and secure a showcase in Nashville. Bart surprises Shannon and invites her to tour with the band, and is confused when Shannon flatly refuses. In Nashville, Brickell introduces Bart to established artists Amy Grant and Michael W. Smith, but is unable to convince record executives to sign the band, who do not believe the band, now performing as "MercyMe", is good enough. Devastated, Bart quits the band, but Brickell thinks that Bart needs to resolve issues in his personal life, so Bart reconciles with the band and asks them to wait for him, and leaves to return home.

Bart returns home late at night, and is confused to find that Arthur has prepared breakfast for him the next morning. Arthur claims to have become a Christian, but Bart is skeptical and refuses to forgive him, and leaves. In anger and despair, Arthur smashes his old Jeep, which he had asked Bart to help him restore. Bart attempts to drive away in Arthur's pickup, but discovers the terminal cancer diagnosis, and returns to Arthur. Bart forgives his father, and the two form a deep bond, but Arthur soon dies of his illness.

After Arthur's funeral, Bart rejoins the band and writes "I Can Only Imagine", and also calls Shannon and apologizes to her for the first time since their breakup. Brickell sends the demo tape to several artists, including Grant, who, deeply moved by the song, asks to record it herself as her next single, and Bart, who just wants the song to be heard, accepts. On stage, Grant begins the song, but can't bring herself to sing it, and calls Bart on stage from the audience to sing it himself. Bart's performance earns an enthusiastic ovation, and he reunites with Shannon, who was also in attendance. The band releases the song as their first single, achieving success on both Christian and mainstream radio.

Cast

 J. Michael Finley as Bart Millard
 Brody Rose as Young Bart Millard
 Tanya Clarke as Adele Millard
 Cloris Leachman as Meemaw Leona Millard, Bart's grandmother
 Madeline Carroll as Shannon Street, Bart's girlfriend
 Taegan Burns as Young Shannon Street
 Dennis Quaid as Arthur Millard, Bart’s abusive father
 Trace Adkins as Scott Brickell, MercyMe's manager
 Priscilla Shirer as Mrs. Fincher, Bart's teacher
 Nicole DuPort as Amy Grant
 Jake B. Miller as Michael W. Smith
 Jason Burkey as Mike Scheuchzer
 Mark Furze as Nathan Cochran
 Randy McDowell as Jim Bryson
 Cole Marcus as Robbie Shaffer
 Gianna Simone as Dr. Avondale
 Kevin Downes as Singleton
 Delilah as Herself

Production

The film was announced in December 2016. Dennis Quaid joined the cast in January 2017. Broadway actor J. Michael Finley, who sang all the songs in the movie, makes his film debut as Bart Millard. The same month, it was announced that the film was slated for release in the spring of 2018. In August 2017, Lionsgate and Roadside Attractions signed on as distributors for the film for a nationwide release in the United States.

Reception

Box office
I Can Only Imagine grossed $83.4 million in the United States and Canada and $1.8 million in other territories, for a worldwide total of $85.2 million, against a production budget of $7 million. It is the fourth-highest grossing music biopic of all-time in the United States, behind Bohemian Rhapsody, Straight Outta Compton and Walk the Line. It is also the highest-grossing independent film of 2018.

I Can Only Imagine was released on March 16, 2018, alongside Tomb Raider and Love, Simon, and was originally projected to gross $2–4 million from 1,620 theaters in its opening weekend. However, after making $6.2 million on its first day (including $1.3 million from Thursday night previews), weekend estimates were increased to $14 million. It ended up grossing $17.1 million, exceeding expectations and finishing third at the box office behind Black Panther and Tomb Raider. 67% of the opening weekend audience was female while 80% was over the age of 35. It was the fourth best-ever opening for a faith-based film, following The Passion of the Christ ($83.8 million), Son of God ($25.6 million) and Heaven Is for Real ($22.5 million). In its second weekend the film was added to 624 additional theaters and dropped just 19% to $13.8 million, again finishing third. It was added to another 395 venues and finished fourth in its third weekend, making $10.4 million (including $3 million on Easter Sunday).

The film has been translated and distributed in several countries, including China, according to co-director Jon Erwin:

Critical response
The website's critical consensus reads, "I Can Only Imagines message will have the most impact among Christian audiences, but overall, its performances and storytelling represent a notable evolution in faith-based cinema." On Metacritic, the film has a weighted average score of 30 out of 100, based on eight critics, indicating "generally unfavorable reviews". Audiences polled by CinemaScore gave the film a rare average grade of "A+" on an A+ to F scale.

The Arizona Republics James Ward gave the film 4 stars out of 5 and wrote, "Too often faith-based films — say anything with Kirk Cameron or the terrible God's Not Dead series — tend to preach to the choir or hector their audience. The Erwins’ films — I Can Only Imagine definitely among them — are more inclusive, charitable of spirit and hopeful, all qualities that are always appreciated, be they rooted in Christian faith or otherwise." David Ehrlich of IndieWire gave the film a "C−" saying: "There’s a reason why all of these movies are so amateurishly made; why they all end with links to religious websites; why they all look like they were shot on an iPhone by a Walmart-brand Janusz Kaminski who lit each interior like the white light of heaven was streaming through every window...Art can be affirmation, but affirmation cannot be art."

Faith-based reviewers mostly gave the movie positive reviews. Megan Basham of World magazine called Quaid "the real workhorse" and added that he "bears the heavy load of convincingly giving us both a monster and a repentant dad longing to connect with his son. Quaid impresses on both counts." Michael Foust of the Southern Baptist Texan gave the film 5 out of 5 stars and wrote, "The screenplay is gripping, the soundtrack is perfect, and the performances by Quaid and Finley had me squirming, laughing and crying."

Home media
The film was released on iTunes and Google Play on June 5, 2018, and on DVD and Blu-ray on June 12, 2018. I Can Only Imagine was the no. 1 film in DVD sales and rentals for the weeks ending June 17 and June 24, 2018. As of February 2020, I Can Only Imagine has earned $24 million in home media sales.

Awards and nominations

See also
Kingdom Story Company
I Still Believe (film)

References

External links
 
 
 
 
 
 I Can Only Imagine at History vs. Hollywood

American drama films
Drama films based on actual events
Roadside Attractions films
2018 films
Films set in Nashville, Tennessee
Films set in Texas
Films shot in Oklahoma
Films about Christianity
Films directed by the Erwin Brothers
2018 drama films
Biographical films about singers
Films produced by Kevin Downes
Films about child abuse
2010s English-language films
2010s American films